Ivo M. Babuška (born March 22, 1926, in Prague) is a mathematician with Czech-American citizenship, noted for his studies of the finite element method and the proof of the Babuška–Lax–Milgram theorem in partial differential equations. One of the celebrated result in the finite elements is the so-called Ladyzenskaja–Babuška–Brezzi (LBB) condition (also referred to in some literature as Banach–Necas–Babuška (BNB)), which provides sufficient conditions for a stable mixed formulation. The LBB condition has guided mathematicians and engineers to develop state-of-the-art formulations for many technologically important problems like Darcy flow, Stokes flow, incompressible Navier–Stokes, nearly incompressible elasticity. 

He is also well known for his work on adaptive methods and the p-- and hp--versions of the finite element method. He also developed the mathematical framework for the partition of unity methods.

Babuska was elected as a member to the National Academy of Engineering in 2005 for contributions to the theory and implementation of finite element methods for computer-based engineering analysis and design.

Life
Ivo Babuška was born on March 22, 1926, in Prague, the son of architect Milan Babuška (who designed the National Technical Museum in Prague) and his wife Marie. He studied civil engineering at the Czech Technical University in Prague, where he received the Dipl. Ing in 1949. In 1951 he received the degree Dr. Tech.; his doctoral dissertation was supervised by Eduard Čech and Vladimir Knichal. From 1949 he studied at Mathematical Institute of the Czechoslovak Academy of Sciences and then was the head of the Department of Partial Differential Equations. In 1955, he received a C.Sc (=Ph.D.) in mathematics and in 1960 D.Sc. in mathematics.  He is married to Renata and they had two children, a girl, Lenka and a boy, Vit.

Babuška fled Communist Czechoslovakia in 1968 with barely more than he could carry, following a conference in Western Europe, and emigrated to the United States. After many years as a professor at the University of Maryland, he eventually moved to the University of Texas at Austin where he spent many years at the Oden Institute for Computational Engineering and Sciences. He moved to New Mexico in 2020, following retirement in 2018 at the age of 92.

Work
Babuška works in the field of mathematics, applied mathematics, numerical methods, finite element methods, and computational mechanics.  In 1968, he became a professor at University of Maryland, College Park in the mathematics department, which is part of the University of Maryland College of Computer, Mathematical, and Natural Sciences. He retired in 1996 as a Distinguished University Professor.  In 1989 he co-founded the company ESRD, Inc. which developed the StressCheck finite element software, putting into practice much of Babuška's research and contributions to the finite element method.  After his time at the University of Maryland, he moved to the Institute for Computational Engineering and Sciences at the University of Texas at Austin where he held the Robert B. Trull Chair in Engineering. Babuška has published more than 300 papers in refereed journals, more than 70 papers in conference proceedings, and several books. He was an invited speaker at many major international conferences and a member of numerous editorial boards for scientific journals.  In 2018 he retired as Professor Emeritus. Among his more than 30 doctoral students are Christoph Schwab and Michael Vogelius.

Honors
He has received many honors for his work, including five doctorates honoris causa, member of European Academy of Sciences (2003), Fellow of SIAM and ICAM, the Czechoslovak State prize for Mathematics, the Leroy P. Steele Prize (2012), the Birkhoff Prize (1994), the Humboldt Award of Federal Republic of Germany, the Neuron Prize Czech Republic, Honorary Foreign Member of the Czech Learned Society and the Bolzano Medal.  In 2003, asteroid 36060 Babuška was named in his honor by the International Astronomical Union.  In 2005, Babuska was awarded the Honorary Medal "De Scientia Et Humanitate Optime Meritis", received the ICAM Congress Medal (Newton Gauss, 2016) and he was elected to the National Academy of Engineering.  He is also a member of the Academy of Medicine, Engineering, and Sciences of Texas.

See also
Discontinuous Galerkin method
Kahan–Babuška summation

References

External links

ISI Highly Cited Author – Ivo Babuška

Numerical analysts
20th-century Czech mathematicians
21st-century American mathematicians
Czech educators
Engineers from Prague
Members of the United States National Academy of Engineering
University of Maryland, College Park faculty
University of Texas at Austin faculty
Fellows of the Society for Industrial and Applied Mathematics
Czechoslovak emigrants to the United States
Mathematicians from Prague
1926 births
Living people
Czech Technical University in Prague alumni
Czechoslovak mathematicians
Czechoslovak exiles